Richard O’Rawe is a former Provisional IRA prisoner and author of Blanketmen.

Background
He grew up in a house at the corner of Peel Street and Mary Street in the Lower Falls district of Belfast.  When that house was demolished in 1970 as part of the redevelopment of the area he and his family moved to Ballymurphy.  It was there that he got involved in politics. He was interned and imprisoned in both the Crumlin Road gaol and in Long Kesh.

Role in the hunger strikes
In Long Kesh prison in 1981, he was Provisional IRA press officer.  He claims that terms for ending the 1981 hunger strikes, accepted by the prisoners' leadership in the prison, were rejected by IRA commanders outside. He suggests that the IRA rejected the deal as the Irish republican candidate Owen Carron would have a better chance of winning the Fermanagh and South Tyrone by-election if the hunger strike was ongoing on polling day.

Publications
 Blanketmen: An Untold Story of the H-block Hunger Strike (2005)
 Afterlives: The Hunger Strike and the Secret Offer that Changed Irish History (2011)
 In the Name of the Son: The Gerry Conlon Story (2017)
 Northern Heist (2018)

References

Living people
Writers from Belfast
21st-century writers from Northern Ireland
Male non-fiction writers from Northern Ireland
Provisional Irish Republican Army members
Year of birth missing (living people)